Al-Muwahib al-ladunniyya bi al-minah al-Muhammadiyya is a book by Islamic scholar Al-Qastallani. The book was commented in Sharh al-Mawahib al-Ladunniyyah (8 volumes) by Muhammad al-Zurqani.

It was abridged by Sheikh Yusuf ibn Ismail ibn Hasan ibn Nasir al-Nabahani al-Naqshbandi (1350/1931)

See also
List of Sunni books

References

Islamic studies books